The 2017 Stanford Cardinal men's soccer team represented Stanford University during the 2017 NCAA Division I men's soccer season. It is the 44th season of the university fielding a program. It the program's sixth season with Jeremy Gunn as head coach. The Cardinal played their home matches at Cagan Stadium.

The Cardinal's 2017 season saw the Cardinal threepeat and win the NCAA Division I Men's Soccer Tournament for the third-consecutive year. The Cardinal also won the Pac-12 Conference championship for the fourth consecutive year. Stanford's NCAA success marked only the second time in NCAA history that a Division I program won the Men's Soccer Championship for three straight seasons. The last feat was Bruce Arena's Virginia teams that won the NCAA tournament from 1991 through 1994.

Roster 

Updated: November 11, 2017

Coaching Staff

Source:

Schedule and results 

|-
!colspan=6 style="background:#8C1515; color:#FFFFFF;"| Preseason
|-

|-
!colspan=6 style="background:#8C1515; color:#FFFFFF;"| Non-conference regular season
|-

|-
!colspan=6 style="background:#8C1515; color:#FFFFFF;"| Pac-12 Conference regular season
|-

|-
!colspan=6 style="background:#8C1515; color:#FFFFFF;"| NCAA Tournament
|-

|-

Professional departures

MLS Draft Picks 
The following members of 2017 Stanford Cardinal men's soccer team were selected in the 2018 MLS SuperDraft.

Homegrown contracts 
The following members of the 2017 Stanford Cardinal men's soccer team signed homegrown contracts with their academy clubs.

References

External links 
 Men's Soccer Schedule

Stanford Cardinal
Stanford Cardinal men's soccer seasons
Stanford Cardinal, Soccer
Stanford Cardinal
Stanford
NCAA Division I Men's Soccer Tournament-winning seasons
NCAA Division I Men's Soccer Tournament College Cup seasons